Montataire is a commune in the Oise department in northern France. Montataire station has rail connections to Beauvais and Creil. The journalist and historian Arthur Dinaux (1795–1864) died in Montataire.

Population

Sights
 Château de Montataire, 12th century castle.

See also
 Communes of the Oise department

References

Communes of Oise